The 2016–17 Atlantic Coast Conference men's basketball season began with practices in October 2016, followed by the start of the 2016–17 NCAA Division I men's basketball season in November. Conference play started in late December 2016 and concluded in March.

With a win over Pittsburgh on February 25, 2017, North Carolina clinched at least a share of the ACC regular season championship for the second straight season, the eighth time in the 14 years under head coach Roy Williams, and the 31st time in school history. A loss by Duke later that day gave the Tar Heels the outright regular season championship.

The ACC tournament was held from March 7–11, 2-17 at the Barclays Center in Brooklyn, New York. Duke defeated Notre Dame to with the tournament championship. As a result, Duke received the conference's automatic bid to the NCAA tournament.

North Carolina forward Justin Jackson was named ACC Player of the Year. Georgia Tech head coach Josh Pastner was named Coach of the Year. Jackson was also named a consensus first-team All-American and Duke guard Luke Kennard was named a second team All-American.

Nine ACC schools (Duke, Florida State, Miami, North Carolina, Notre Dame, Virginia, Virginia Tech, and Wake Forest) received invitations to the NCAA tournament. The conference achieved an 11–8 record in the NCAA tournament, however only North Carolina won more than one game. North Carolina went on to with the NCAA Championship, defeating Gonzaga. Clemson, Georgia Tech, and Syracuse received bids to the National Invitation Tournament. The conference achieved a 5–3 record in the NIT, with Georgia Tech losing to TCU in the championship game.

Head coaches

Coaching changes 
 On March 21, 2016, Pittsburgh head coach Jamie Dixon left the school to take the head coaching position at his alma mater, TCU. On March 27, 2016, the school hired Kevin Stallings as head coach.
 On March 25, 2016, Georgia Tech announced Brian Gregory would not return as head coach. On April 8, 2016, the school hired Josh Pastner as head coach.

Coaches

Notes:
 Year at school includes 2016–17 season.
 Overall and ACC records are from time at current school and are through the end the 2016–17 season.
 NCAA tournament appearances are from time at current school only.
 NCAA Final Fours and Championship include time at other schools

Preseason

Regular season

Rankings

Conference matrix
This table summarizes the head-to-head results between teams in conference play. Each team will play 18 conference games, and at least 1 against each opponent.

Postseason

ACC tournament

  March 7–11, 2017 Atlantic Coast Conference basketball tournament, Barclays Center, Brooklyn, New York.

* Denotes Overtime Game

AP Rankings at time of tournament

NCAA tournament

National Invitation Tournament

Honors and awards

All-Americans

To earn "consensus" status, a player must win honors from a majority of the following teams: the 
Associated Press, the USBWA, The Sporting News and the National Association of Basketball Coaches.

ACC honors and awards

NBA draft

The ACC had 14 players drafted in the 2017 NBA draft.  10 players were drafted in the first round, and 4 players were drafted in the second round.

References